Epilectus is a genus of beetles in the family Carabidae, containing the following species:

 Epilectus fortis Blackburn, 1888
 Epilectus mastersi W. J. Macleay, 1869

References

Scaritinae